The Eastern Star Lodge 207 F&AM is a historic Masonic meeting hall outside St. Francis, Arkansas. It was built in 1947 to serve as the first purpose-built home of the local Masonic lodge. Its interior decorations include elements removed from the previous lodge, a repurposed Presbyterian church. The building has long been a significant area social center, hosting public and private functions.

The building was listed on the National Register of Historic Places in 2002.

See also
National Register of Historic Places listings in Clay County, Arkansas
List of Masonic buildings in the United States

References

Clubhouses on the National Register of Historic Places in Arkansas
Buildings and structures completed in 1947
Buildings and structures in Clay County, Arkansas
Masonic buildings in Arkansas
National Register of Historic Places in Clay County, Arkansas